Teleasinae is a subfamily of wasps in the family Platygastridae. There are about 14 genera and more than 250 species in Teleasinae.

The subfamilies Scelioninae, Teleasinae, and Telenominae were formerly in the family Scelionidae, but Scelionidae was combined with the family Platygastridae because of genetic similarities. The name Platygastridae was retained for the resulting family because of seniority.

Genera
These genera belong to the subfamily Teleasinae:

 Ceratoteleas Kozlov, 1965
 Dvivarnus Rajmohana & Veenakumari, 2011
 Echinoteleas Risbec, 1954
 Gryonella Dodd, 1914
 Gryonoides Dodd, 1920
 Odontoscelio Kieffer, 1905
 Prosacantha Nees, 1834
 Ptilostenius Kozlov & Lê, 1988
 Scutelliteleas Szabó, 1966
 Teleas Latreille, 1809
 Trimorus Förster, 1856
 Trisacantha Ashmead, 1887
 Xenomerus Walker, 1836
 † Cretaxenomerus Nel & Azar, 2005

References

Further reading

 

Parasitic wasps
Platygastridae
Hymenoptera subfamilies